Phillip Walsh or Phil Walsh may refer to:

Phil Walsh (Australian footballer) (1960–2015), former coach of Adelaide in the Australian Football League and player
Phil Walsh (English footballer) (born 1984), current professional association footballer in England, most recently for Bath City
Phil K. Walsh (died 1935), Australian actor and silent film producer